Archibald Butler (1 September 1879 – 5 March 1951) was an Australian rules footballer who played for the South Melbourne Football Club in the Victorian Football League (VFL).

References

External links 

1879 births
1951 deaths
Australian rules footballers from Victoria (Australia)
Mordialloc Football Club players
Sydney Swans players